The  is a DC electric multiple unit (EMU) commuter train type operated by West Japan Railway Company (JR-West) in the Kansai Region of Japan.

Overview
The 321 series was developed from the earlier 207 series to replace the ageing 201 series and 205 series trains on the Tōkaidō Main Line. One 321 series set also replaced the 207 series (set Z16) withdrawn due to collision damage sustained in the Amagasaki derailment of 25 April 2005.

Operations
The 321 series share the same assignments as their 207 series counterparts. All 39 sets are allocated to Aboshi depot.
 Tōkaidō Main Line and Sanyō Main Line:   – 
 Fukuchiyama Line:  – Sasayamaguchi
 JR Tōzai Line and Katamachi Line: Amagasaki – 
 Osaka Higashi Line and Kansai Main Line (Yamatoji Line): Kizu – , Nara –  –

Formation

KuMoHa 321 and MoHa 321 cars each have two scissors-type pantographs.

Interior

References

External links

 Kinki Sharyo information  

Electric multiple units of Japan
West Japan Railway Company
Train-related introductions in 2005
Kinki Sharyo multiple units
1500 V DC multiple units of Japan